James Fleming or Flemming (1682 – 31 March 1751) was a British major-general, and colonel of the 36th (Herefordshire) Regiment of Foot.

Life

Fleming was wounded at the Battle of Blenheim when serving as a captain in the Earl of Derby's regiment (16th Foot, now 1st Bedford).
Afterwards for many years, he commanded the Royal Fusiliers, until promoted on 9 January 1741, colonel of the 36th Foot (now 2nd Worcester). 
He became a brigadier-general in 1745, was present at both the Battle of Falkirk and the Battle of Culloden, and became major-general in 1747.

Legacy
He died at Bath, 31 March 1751. 
A monument with a medallion portrait and figures of Hercules and Minerva was erected to his memory in Westminster Abbey, where he is buried.

Notes

References
Attribution:
; Endnotes:
Cannon's Hist. Records 16th Foot and 36th Foot
Evans's Catalogue of Engraved Portraits (London, 1836–53), volume ii.
Scots Magazine xiii. 165.

1682 births
1751 deaths
British Army major generals
British Army personnel of the Jacobite rising of 1745
Bedfordshire and Hertfordshire Regiment officers
Burials at Westminster Abbey
Royal Fusiliers officers
36th Regiment of Foot officers
British military personnel of the War of the Spanish Succession